Tom Taaffe (b. 15 June 1963) is an Irish racehorse trainer based at Portree Stables, Boston, Ardclough, Straffan, in County Kildare. 

He began training in the 1994/95 jumps season, having had a successful career as a professional jump jockey for the Arthur Moore stable.  

The son of jockey and trainer, Pat Taaffe, who famously rode Arkle to a Cheltenham Gold Cup treble in the 1960s and trained 1974 Gold Cup winner Captain Christy, he emulated his father's success by training Kicking King to win the same race in 2005. The horse also had back to back wins for Taaffe in the King George VI Chase in 2004 and 2005. Taaffe also trained Ninetieth Minute, who won the Coral Cup at the 2009 Cheltenham Festival.

Other notable horses trained by him are Emotional Moment, Solar System (now retired), Tumbling Dice and Secret Native. The yard's jockey of choice is Tom Ryan.

Statistics on Irish-Racing.com show that Taaffe has had an amazing strike rate of 15% in Ireland since 2001.

References

External links

  Tom Taaffe Racing

Irish racehorse owners and breeders
Irish racehorse trainers
Sportspeople from County Kildare
Living people
1963 births
People educated at Belvedere College